The Zinneke Parade is a biennial parade held in the City of Brussels, Belgium, since 2000. It is a cultural event organised by the Zinneke Association, which brings together at each edition about 1500 participants. A different theme is chosen for each parade. 

The parade was established with the aim of connecting the many different cultures, communities and districts within Brussels. The director of the Zinneke Association, Myriam Stoffen, has talked about the desire to 'build bridges' between these parts of the city. The organisers of the parade aim to work with a large variety of institutions, schools, cultural centres, organisations and societies. Residents work together with professional artists to create the ideas and prepare the projects which eventually make up the parade.

A characteristic of the parade which distinguishes it from many other parades or carnivals is that it is described as being "100% human" – music is performed live, without amplification, and there are no motorised vehicles.

History
The Zinneke Parade was created for the first time as part of Brussels 2000, European Capital of Culture, with the aim of organising a multicultural carnival, a creative and participative event "likely to reconcile the Brussels population with its identity".

Zinneke is a nickname chosen to represent people from Brussels. The word means "mutt" or "bastard" in Brusselian dialect, and originally referred to the city's stray dogs that hung around the streets by the Lesser Senne (a tangent canal of the river Senne, which circumnavigated Brussels along the city walls) until the end of the 19th century.

The Zinneke Parade was watched by 60,000 spectators in 2006. In 2008, over 7000 people were involved with the parade , under the theme "Eau / Water" ("Water"), with 2500 of these appearing in the parade itself. 

The 2010 theme was "A table / Aan tafel" ("Have a meal" or "Come to the Table!") and was held in May. In 2010, the parade was accompanied by a group of puppeteers from Belgium, Ireland, Italy and France, who performed in a number of balconies overlooking the route of the parade.
The participants in the parade formed about 25 'zinnodes', groups of around 100 people each, which started from four squares in the city: the Place Fontainas/Fontainasplein, Sainte-Catherine/Sint-Katelijne, the Place de l'Albertine/Albertinaplein and the Place d'Espagne/Spanjeplein; then met along the way.

The 2012 Zinneke Parade took place on 19 May 2012, under the theme "Désordre / Wanorde" ("Disorder"). It was viewable from 22 locations around the centre of the City of Brussels, starting at 3 p.m. from the Grand-Place/Grote Markt (Brussels' main square). The 2016 Zinneke Parade, with the theme "Fragil" ("Fragile"), took place on 21 May 2016. The 2020 edition, with the theme "Wolven ! / Aux loups !" ("Wolves !"), was cancelled due to the COVID-19 pandemic in Belgium.

Parade images

See also 

 Het Zinneke

References

Notes

External links

 

Culture in Brussels
Parades in Belgium
2000 establishments in Belgium
Recurring events established in 2000
Tourist attractions in Brussels
City of Brussels
Spring (season) events in Belgium